Euderces pulcher is a species of beetle in the family Cerambycidae. It was described by Henry Walter Bates in 1874 and is known from Central and North America, specifically from Nicaragua, Honduras, Guatemala, and Mexico. Its larvae feed on Guazuma ulmifolia.

References

Euderces
Beetles of Central America
Beetles of North America
Insects of Mexico
Beetles described in 1874
Taxa named by Henry Walter Bates